Geoffrey Kemp Howard (born 8 November 1955) is an Australian politician. He was a Labor Party member of the Victorian Legislative Assembly, representing Ballarat East from 1999 to 2014, and Buninyong from 2014 to 2018.

Life and work
Howard was born at Geelong, Victoria, and attended public schools in Belmont and Geelong. He received a Bachelor of Agricultural Science in 1977 from the University of Melbourne and a Graduate Diploma of Education in 1979 from State College Rusden. He became a secondary school teacher at Kaniva in 1980, moving to Ballarat in 1982. He joined the Labor Party in 1987, and was elected to Ballarat City Council in 1989. He was mayor in 1993 and 1994, but left the council in 1994, only to return in 1996.

Howard left the council in 1999 after he was preselected as the Labor candidate for the Liberal-held seat of Ballarat East prior to the 1999 state election. At the election, Howard defeated sitting MP Barry Traynor. He was immediately appointed Parliamentary Secretary for Natural Resources and the Environment in 1999, moving to Parliamentary Secretary for Agriculture in 2002. In 2006, he lost his parliamentary secretary position, and became chair of the Education and Training Committee.

References

External links
 Parliamentary voting record of Geoff Howard at Victorian Parliament Tracker

1955 births
Living people
Australian Labor Party members of the Parliament of Victoria
Members of the Victorian Legislative Assembly
21st-century Australian politicians